The First Periodic Review of Scottish Parliament Boundaries was carried out by the Boundary Commission for Scotland. It was announced on 3 July 2007 that the review was taking place. Provisional proposals were published on 14 February 2008 and the final proposals were published on 26 May 2010. The new constituencies and regions were used for the first time at the 2011 Scottish Parliament election. 

The Scottish Parliament (Constituencies) Act 2004 requires the commission to review boundaries of all constituencies except Orkney and Shetland (which cover, respectively, the Orkney Islands council area and the Shetland Islands council area) so that the area covered by the reviewed constituencies will continue to be covered by a total of 71 constituencies.

The Orkney and Shetland constituencies were taken into account, however, in review of boundaries of the additional member regions.

Final recommendations followed public consultations and a series of local inquiries, and the terms of the 2004 act required final recommendations to be submitted in a report to the Secretary of State for Scotland.

A second review should have taken place within 12 years of the last; however, by the time of the 2021 Scottish Parliament election this had not taken place. A meeting of the Boundary Commission in 2017 indicated that an extension would be sought by the Scottish Government to have the constituencies reviewed by the time of the next proposed election in 2025 (now 2026).

Boundary changes 

For the purposes of the review the Boundary Commission for Scotland must take into account the boundaries of the local government council areas. In order to do this some council areas were grouped together; the largest of these groupings of provisional proposals consisted of four of Scotland's 32 council areas, and the smallest only containing one. Constituencies created in 1999 were based on Scottish Westminster constituencies that were created in 1997 and were based on the  boundaries of local government regions and districts and islands areas that existed at that time but have since been abolished and replaced with the council areas.

Following the provisional proposal stages the Commission published their Final Recommendations. All the review processes were completed with the outlined constituencies below.

Constituencies

Electoral regions 
The Boundary Commission have also recommended changes to the electoral regions used to elect "list" members of the Scottish Parliament. The recommendations can be summarised below;

References

External links 

 
2011 in Scotland
2011 in British politics